Nicolás Sartori Iparraguirre (born 23 May 1976 in Los Toldos) is an Argentine football defender. Since 2008 he plays for Club Atlético Sarmiento in the Primera B Metropolitana.

External links
 Profile at BoliviaGol.com 
 
 

Association football defenders
Argentine footballers
Argentine expatriate footballers
Sportspeople from Buenos Aires Province
Universidad de Chile footballers
Club Atlético Huracán footballers
Chacarita Juniors footballers
C.D. Jorge Wilstermann players
The Strongest players
Gimnasia y Esgrima de Jujuy footballers
Ferro Carril Oeste footballers
Club León footballers
Expatriate footballers in Bolivia
Expatriate footballers in Chile
Club Atlético Sarmiento footballers
Argentine expatriate sportspeople in Bolivia
1976 births
Living people